Z Code (like Q Code and X Code) is a set of operating signals used in CW, TTY and RTTY radio communication. There are at least three sets of Z-codes: one originally developed by Cable & Wireless Ltd. (the Cable & Wireless Service Z-Code) for commercial communications in the early days of wire and radio communications, one independently developed by NATO forces later for military needs and use, and one developed by APCO. The NATO Z Code is still in use today, and is published in the unclassified document ACP-131. There are other sets of codes internally used by Russia's military and other operating agencies. The old C&W Z Codes are not widely used today.

A lot of the old C&W codes are derived from mnemonics (ZAL = alter wavelength, ZAP = ack please, ZSF = send faster, etc.

See also
 ACP-131

References

External links 
 Ralf D. Kloth DL4TA – List of Z-codes 
 ACP 131(F) – Communications Instructions Operating Signals

Operating signals
Encodings
Morse code